The 1947 Akron Zippers football team was an American football team that represented the University of Akron as a member of the Ohio Athletic Conference (OAC) during the 1947 college football season. In its second and final season under head coach Paul Baldacci, the team compiled am overall record of 2–6 with a mark of 2–5 in conference play and was outscored by a total of 162 to 44. The team played its home games at the Rubber Bowl in Akron, Ohio.

Schedule

References

Akron
Akron Zips football seasons
Akron Zippers football